The Trachyte Hills are a small, hilly mountain range in southern British Columbia, Canada, located southwest of the junction of Bonaparte River and Hat Creek.  They are a continuation northwards of the Cornwall Hills.

References

Trachyte Hills in the Canadian Mountain Encyclopedia

Mountain ranges of the Interior Plateau
Hills of British Columbia
Landforms of the Cariboo